During the live-shows of season 13, it was announced that the castings for season 14 will start in August 2016. In late 2016, broadcaster RTL gave closer details to the changes of season 14. The pre-recorded concerts in clubs in Germany were replaced by the "Mottoshows" (theme shows) which were used from season 1 to 10.

In 2016, RTL announced that H.P. Baxxter, Dieter Bohlen and Michelle would return, while Vanessa Mai was replaced by YouTuber Shirin David. Oliver Geissen returned as the host of the live shows. The season marked an all-time high because there was a "final 14" which was the highest amount of Mottoshow contestants ever. Also for the first time a wild card voting was introduced where the public voted Alphonso Williams who was eliminated just before the Mottoshows back in the competition. Alphonso Williams was announced the winner on 6 May followed by Alexander Jahnke, Maria Voskania and Duygu Goenel. With 54 years Williams is the oldest winner to date.

Auditions and "Recall" 
There were changes in the rules: New casting candidates were also present during the "Recall" phase, which takes place in Dubai this year. In addition, the groups' Recalls are now treated as those of casting candidates: Each group has to select the Golden CD of a juror before the performance. Directly after the performance, the jurors individually assess the members of the group and agree on their continuation; in the case of a 2: 2 the voice of the jurors, whose Golden CD was selected, counts twice. In the squadrons before the jury met again after all the appearances of a round, decided together which candidates to leave and announced this before all candidates.

Finalists
The Finalist were announced just before the first Mottoshow where only 13 of the last 16 contestants proceeded. Just before the second Mottoshow, it was announced that either Alphonso Williams or Benjamin Timon Donndorf would be returning as a wild card. Alphonso Williams was chosen. Which made it a final 14 in total.

"Mottoshows"
The five Mottoshows will be held from 8 April until 6 May 2017. Only thirteen of the last sixteen proceeded on the live shows' start. Before the second Mottoshow it was announced that Alphonso Williams was brought back as a wild card. Making it a Top fourteen in total. The voting results were published right after the finale.

Color key

Top 16 Elimination 
Original airdate: 8 April 2017
The final 16 were announced on 1 April 2017 and the final 13 were announced on 6 April.

Top 13 – Partyhits
Original airdate: 8 April 2017

Top 11 – My favorite song
Original airdate: 15 April 2017
On 13 April it was announced that there would be a wild card. The public votes on the two pre-eliminated contestants Alphonso Williams and Benjamin Timon Donndorf to return. Andrea Renzullo was not an option due to a contract issue. On 14 April Williams was announced as the wild card winner.
 Wild card voting

Normal voting

Top 8 – Movie songs
Original airdate: 22 April 2017
 This week the contestant sang a solo song and a duet.

Top 6 – Semi-final (Anthems of the musical history)
Original airdate: 29 April 2017

Top 4 – Finale (Solo song, Favorite performance & Winner's single)
Original airdate: 6 May 2017
The final result was announced after all four contestants performed their three songs.

Elimination chart

References

External links 
 Official website

Season 14
2017 in German music
2017 German television seasons